Cruach Mhor is a  mountain in Argyll and Bute in Scotland.

References

Mountains and hills of Argyll and Bute
Marilyns of Scotland